Tibioploides is a genus of sheet weavers that was first described by K. Y. Eskov & Y. M. Marusik in 1991.

Species
 it contains seven species, found in Estonia and Scandinavia:
Tibioploides arcuatus (Tullgren, 1955) – Scandinavia, Russia, Estonia
Tibioploides cyclicus Sha & Zhu, 1995 – China
Tibioploides eskovianus Saito & Ono, 2001 – Japan
Tibioploides kurenstchikovi Eskov & Marusik, 1991 – Russia
Tibioploides monticola Saito & Ono, 2001 – Japan
Tibioploides pacificus Eskov & Marusik, 1991 (type) – Russia
Tibioploides stigmosus (Xia, Zhang, Gao, Fei & Kim, 2001) – China, Russia (Kurile Is.)

See also
 List of Linyphiidae species (Q–Z)

References

Araneomorphae genera
Linyphiidae
Spiders of Asia